The Peace Treaty of 363 between the Eastern Roman Empire and the Sasanian Empire was the subsequent treaty from Emperor Julian's Persian expedition. Upon Julian's death, the newly elected Emperor Jovian was forced into signing a humiliating treaty by which territorial and diplomatic concessions were given to the Sasanians.

Background

Julian's preparations 
After his accession to the Roman throne in AD 361, Emperor Julian reinitiated the war against Sasanid Persia. Over the winter of 362–63 Julian established his headquarters in Antioch, and as soon as spring arrived he was ready to take the field. Within a month of his departure from Antioch, a force of around 80,000 had been assembled at Carrhae. This army under Julian marched swiftly south-east along the Euphrates river on route to Ctesiphon, the enemy capital. The remainder of the Roman forces, with the aid of the King of Armenia Arshak II, was ordered to effect a junction with the emperor before the walls of Ctesiphon, marching east by way of Nisibis and then south along the Tigris.

Progress of the war 
The southern arm of the Roman invasion met with some initial success. The Tigris was crossed, and the Sasanian army which contested its passage was defeated and penned up in Ctesiphon. After a vain attempt to penetrate further east to Susa, Julian was forced to abandon his fleet and most of his provisions, and was at length convinced that no option remained to him but a retreat.

On 26 June 363, during the Battle of Samarra, Julian was wounded. His death that night, and the subsequent election by the troops of Jovian as his successor, seemed to secure the end of the campaign. Jovian led the Roman legions to Dura. By the time they had arrived their provisions were exhausted and their attempts to cross the Tigris failed. Jovian, having no recourse, petitioned Shapur for peace.

Terms of the treaty 
The terms of the treaty were:
A thirty years truce
that the Roman influence in Armenia be renounced
the return of Arzanene, Moxoene, Zabdicene, Rehimena and Corduene to the Sasanian Empire
the surrender of Nisibis, Castra Maurorum and Singara to the Sasanian Empire

See also
Shapur II

References

Sources

Further reading
 

Roman–Sasanian Wars
4th-century treaties
Julian (emperor)
Shapur II
Julian's Persian expedition
Treaties of the Sasanian Empire
Treaties of the Roman Empire